Arthur French may refer to:

 Arthur French (actor) (1931–2021), American actor and director
 Arthur French (politician) (1764–1820), MP for the Irish constituency of Roscommon, 1801–1821
 Arthur French, 1st Baron de Freyne (1786–1856), United Kingdom Member of Parliament for Roscommon, 1821–1832